Terje Moe may refer to:

Terje Moe (architect) (1930–2009), Norwegian architect
Terje Moe (painter) (1943–2004), Norwegian painter
Terje Moe Gustavsen (born 1954), Norwegian politician